Enigmatic LIA is the third studio album by Japanese singer-songwriter Lia.

Track listing

CD 

輝～HIKARI (enigmatic mix) / Shine～HIKARI (enigmatic mix)
NEW WORLD (OMEGA FORCE mix)
Farewell Song (DJ Storm & Euphony remix)
Goin'on! (original mix)
getting started (TRUE SKOOL remix)
FAIRY LAND (DJ ZET mix)
あなたがいるだけで (NUstyle GABBA mix) / You Just Are (NUstyle GABBA mix)
Starting Over (From the album "prismatic")
You are... (OMEGA FORCE mix)
SAYONARA (original mix)
I'm wondering (original mix)
enigmatic (original mix)
Birthday Song, Requiem  (Eupho-LIA Hardcore remix)
Light In the Air (original version)

DVD
Light In the Air -Music Video-
enigmatic LIA -Commercial Movie-

External links 
http://lias-cafe.com/descography/lia_descography.html

2006 albums
Lia (singer) albums